Dinja van Liere (born 16 August 1990) is a Dutch dressage rider. She competed at the European Dressage Championships in Hagen 2021 and was the traveling reserve for the Dutch team at the Olympic Games in Tokyo.

Equestrian career
Van Liere started riding at a young age and became stable rider at Stal Hexagon. In 2012 she became National Indoor Champion in the M2 level and the same year she won a bronze medal at the World Championships for Young Horses in Verden, Germany. The years after she rode successfully in the Grand Prix under 25, but her breakthrough came in 2021 when she competed two horses Haute Couture and Hermes in the international Grand Prix. She was named to represent The Netherlands at the Olympic Games in Tokyo but after a technical mistake in the owners' registration in the database of the FEI, she was not allowed to compete that horse. With her other horse Haute Couture Van Liere was named as traveling reserve. A month later she was selected by the Dutch Equestrian Federation to compete at the European Championships in Hagen.

References

External links
 

Living people
1990 births
Dutch female equestrians
Dutch dressage riders
21st-century Dutch women